The following is a list of Important Bird Areas in the United Kingdom:

England
 Bodmin Moor, Cornwall
 Duddon Estuary, Cumbria
 Leighton Moss RSPB reserve, Lancashire

Scotland

References

 Pritchard, D. E., S. D. Housden, G. P. Mudge, C. A. Galbraith and M. W. Pienkowski (Eds.) 1992 Important Bird Areas in the UK including the Channel Islands and the Isle of Man published by RSPB